This is a list of the National Register of Historic Places listings in Van Buren County, Iowa.

This is intended to be a complete list of the properties and districts on the National Register of Historic Places in Van Buren County, Iowa, United States.  Latitude and longitude coordinates are provided for many National Register properties and districts; these locations may be seen together in a map.

There are 20 properties and districts listed on the National Register in the county. Another three properties were once listed, but have since been removed.

|}

Former listings
Other properties were once listed on the register, but were removed:

.
|}

See also

 List of National Historic Landmarks in Iowa
 National Register of Historic Places listings in Iowa
 Listings in neighboring counties: Clark (MO), Davis, Henry, Jefferson, Lee, Scotland (MO)

References

Van Buren
 
Buildings and structures in Van Buren County, Iowa